is a former Nippon Professional Baseball outfielder and the current coach of the Hokkaido Nippon-Ham Fighters.

External links

1980 births
Living people
Baseball people from Toyama Prefecture
Kokushikan University alumni
Japanese baseball players
Nippon Professional Baseball outfielders
Nippon Ham Fighters players
Hokkaido Nippon-Ham Fighters players
Yomiuri Giants players
Japanese baseball coaches
Nippon Professional Baseball coaches